Events in the year 1882 in Costa Rica.

Incumbents
President: Tomás Guardia Gutiérrez until July 6, Saturnino Lizano Gutiérrez until July 20, Próspero Fernández Oreamuno

Events

Births

Deaths
July 6 - Tomás Guardia Gutiérrez

References

 
Years of the 19th century in Costa Rica